Like all municipalities of Puerto Rico, Gurabo is subdivided into administrative units called barrios, which are roughly comparable to minor civil divisions, (and means wards or boroughs or neighborhoods in English). The barrios and subbarrios, in turn, are further subdivided into smaller local populated place areas/units called sectores (sectors in English). The types of sectores may vary, from normally sector to urbanización to reparto to barriada to residencial, among others. Some sectors appear in two barrios.

List of sectors by barrio

Celada

Alturas de Celada
Apartamentos Villas del Soportal
Parcelas Toquí
Sector Casul (Carretera 181, km 22.6)
Sector Celada Centro
Sector El Abanico
Sector El Colchón
Sector El Trapiche
Sector Eugenio Ruíz
Sector Faro Gómez
Sector Felo Reyes
Sector Hernáiz
Sector Juan Acevedo
Sector La Tablita
Sector La Tosca
Sector Los Chinos Sur
Sector Los Chinos
Sector Los Meléndez
Sector Los Pocholos
Sector Los Toledo
Sector Ortiz
Sector Pepe Morales
Sector Román
Sector Rufo Ramírez
Sector Toqui
Sector Urrutia
Sector Villa Joan
Urbanización Heavenly View
Urbanización Lomas del Sol

Gurabo barrio-pueblo

Casco del Pueblo
Barriada Nueva
El Cerro
Sector Vietnam
Sector Rabo del Buey

Hato Nuevo

Extensión Alturas de Hato Nuevo
Los Rivera
Los Sueños
Parcelas Lomas Verdes
Parcelas María Jiménez
Parcelas Nuevas Celada
Parcelas Viejas Celada
Sector Álamo
Sector Alicea
Sector Cando Gómez
Sector Cantera
Sector Caraballo
Sector Catalino Gómez
Sector Concepción Ortiz
Sector Estancia
Sector Goytía
Sector Josean Boria
Sector Lomas Verdes
Sector Los Cruces
Sector Los Gómez
Sector Los Márquez
Sector Los Ortiz
Sector Los Resto
Sector Los Solares
Sector María Jiménez
Sector Montañez
Sector Monte Moriah
Sector Niño Díaz
Sector Prudo Pérez
Sector Querube
Sector Sico Díaz
Sector Valeriano Díaz (Camilo Díaz)
Sector Valeriano Díaz
Sector Valle Verde
Sector Vázquez
Sector Vidal Santos
Terra Ciudad Jardín
Urbanización Alturas de Hato Nuevo
Urbanización Los Flamboyanes
Urbanización Los Paisajes
Urbanización Los Robles
Urbanización Vistalago

Jaguar

Sector Aguayo
Sector Bezares
Sector Carrasquillo
Sector Los Benítez
Sector Los Fonseca
Sector Los García
Sector Los Núñez
Sector Maldonado
Sector Mariera
Sector Marina Rodríguez
Sector Ocasio
Sector Paquita Ramírez
Sector Pérez
Sector Rufo Avilés

Jaguas

Hacienda Mirador
Jaguas Lomas
Quintas del Lago
Sector Adorno
Sector Arturo López
Sector Cáceres
Sector Calletano Sanchéz
Sector Carazo
Sector Carrasquillo
Sector Colón Flores
Sector Cosme
Sector Negrón
Sector Díaz
Sector Felipe Ocasio
Sector Felix Díaz
Sector Guillermo Flores
Sector Isidro Vázquez
Sector Jaguas Llanos
Sector Jaguas Peñón
Sector Juan Guadalupe
Sector La Agrícola
Sector Las Casitas
Sector Llinás
Sector Los Colones
Sector Los Oyola
Sector Los Paganes
Sector Los Quiñones
Sector Los Vives
Sector Márquez
Sector Núñez
Sector Ocasio
Sector Oller
Sector Olmedo
Sector Oyola
Sector Pagán
Sector Pepe Díaz
Sector Richard Rivera
Sector Soto
Sector Tino Torres
Sector Urrutia
Sector Viera Pérez
Sector Vives
Sector Zavala

Mamey

Condominio Caminito
Extensión San José
Reparto San José
Sector Bernabé Candelaria
Sector Colinas de Gurabo
Sector Cristóbal Casul
Sector El Campito
Sector Estancias de Monte Sol
Sector Geño González
Sector Juan López
Sector La Lomita
Sector Lucas Rivalta
Sector Mamey 1
Sector Mamey 2
Sector Marina Rodríguez
Sector Opio
Sector Pablo Hernández
Sector Padilla
Sector Rodríguez Fortis
Sector Rufo Avilés
Sector Tomás Rodríguez
Urbanización Ciudad Jardín
Urbanización El Paraíso
Urbanización Jardines de Gurabo
Urbanización Llanos de Gurabo
Urbanización Los Altos
Urbanización Parque Las Américas
Urbanización Valle del Tesoro
Urbanización Valles de Ensueño

Masa

Camino Santos Garcia
Parcelas Viejas Ramón T. Colón
Reverendo Pedro Parrilla
Sector Buenos Aires
Sector Eugenio Ruiz
Sector Goyo Márquez
Sector Julio Boria
Sector Lomas del Viento
Sector Los Rivero
Sector Los Viera
Sector Masa I
Sector Masa II
Sector Miranda
Sector Peyo Alemán
Sector Resto
Sector Santana

Navarro

Alturas de Santa Bárbara
Apartamentos Maga Tree Village
Apartamentos Las Vistas de Gurabo
Apartamentos Paseo Gran Vista
College High
Condominio El Alcázar
Condominio Paseo Gales
Condominio Ventanas de Gurabo
Parcelas de Navarro
Reina de los Ángeles
Sector Bruceles
Sector Carlos Rivera
Sector Cielito
Sector Los Flamboyanes
Sector Los Flores
Sector Los Pinos
Sector Los Solares
Sector Mano Manca
Sector Pachanga
Sector Quebrada
Sector Santa Bárbara
Urbanización Alta Paz
Urbanización Campiñas de Navarro
Urbanización Colinas de Navarro
Urbanización College Hills
Urbanización El Convento
Urbanización Estancias de Gran Vista
Urbanización Estancias de Monte Verde
Urbanización Estancias de Santa Bárbara
Urbanización Gran Vista I
Urbanización Gran Vista II
Urbanización Horizontes
Urbanización Las Lilas
Urbanización Mansiones de Navarro
Urbanización Mansiones de Santa Bárbara
Urbanización Monte Alto
Urbanización Monte Brisas
Urbanización Monte Subasio
Urbanización Paraíso de Santa Bárbara
Urbanización Paseos de Santa Bárbara
Urbanización Praderas de Navarro
Urbanización Preciosa
Urbanización Sabanera del Río
Urbanización Santa Bárbara
Urbanización Valle Santa Bárbara
Urbanización Ventanas Al Valle
Urbanización Vereda
Valle Borikén

Quebrada Infierno

Los Corcino
Sector Aponte
Sector Brígido Adorno
Sector Delgado
Sector Díaz Ayala
Sector Díaz Rodríguez
Sector El Silencio
Sector La Agrícola
Sector Lomas del Viento
Sector Los Arroyo
Sector Los Mudos
Sector Los Pinos
Sector Medina
Sector Santa Rita
Sector Tulo Alemán
Sector Villanueva

Rincón

Barriada Las Flores
Buena Vista Apartments
Condominio Villas del Este (Modena 1, 2, 3)
Égida Gurabo Elderly Housing
Reparto San José
Residencial Luis del Carmen Echevarría
Sector Agosto
Sector Bella Vista
Sector Cabezudo
Sector Castro
Sector Cayano
Sector Gómez
Sector Jalisco
Sector La Finca
Sector Leal
Sector Los Calderón
Sector Los Cuadrado
Sector Los Rodríguez
Sector Matanzo
Sector Matías Jiménez
Sector Pello Cruz
Sector Perdomo
Sector Pérez
Sector Piro Cruz
Sector Sánchez Cabezudo
Sector Sánchez
Urbanización Campamento
Urbanización El Vivero
Urbanización Los Maestros
Urbanización O'Reilly
Urbanización Senderos de Gurabo
Urbanización Toscana
Urbanización Villa Alegre
Urbanización Villa del Carmen
Urbanización Villa Marina I
Urbanización Villa Marina II
Urbanización Villas de Gurabo
Urbanización Villas de Gurabo II

See also

 List of communities in Puerto Rico

References

Gurabo
Gurabo